Willie Lee Simmons (born March 21, 1947) is an American politician and former member of the Mississippi State Senate from the 13th District, where he served from 1993 to 2020. Simmons ran for election to the Mississippi Transportation Commission; he won the election, becoming the Central Commissioner. He is a member of the Democratic Party. His daughter is Sarita Simmons, Senator for Mississippi's 13th district.

References

1947 births
African-American state legislators in Mississippi
Living people
Democratic Party members of the Mississippi House of Representatives
21st-century American politicians
People from Utica, Mississippi
21st-century African-American politicians
20th-century African-American people